A groyne (in the U.S. groin) is a rigid hydraulic structure built perpendicularly from an ocean shore (in coastal engineering) or a river bank, interrupting water flow and limiting the movement of sediment. It is usually made out of wood, concrete, or stone. In the ocean, groynes create beaches, prevent beach erosion caused by longshore drift where this is the dominant process and facilitate beach nourishment. There is also often cross-shore movement which if longer than the groyne will limit its effectiveness. In a river, groynes slow down the process of erosion and prevent ice-jamming, which in turn aids navigation.

Groynes run generally perpendicular to the shore, extending from the upper foreshore or beach into the water. All of a groyne may be underwater, in which case it is a submerged groyne. They are often used in tandem with seawalls and other coastal engineering features. Groynes, however, may cause a shoreline to be perceived as unnatural. Groynes are generally straight but could be of various plan view shapes, permeable or impermeable, built from various materials such as wood, sand, stone rubble, or gabion, etc.

Background

Etymology
The term groyne is derived from the Old French , from Late Latin , "snout".

History
One of the earliest mentions of groynes is in connection with the planned improvements to the silted-up Dover harbour, by one Fernando Poyntz in 1582.

In 1713 the first wooden groyne to protect Brighton's seafront and coastline was built, which had been heavily damaged in the Great storm of 1703, and again in 1705. In 1867, the first concrete groyne was built near East Street, Brighton as a 60 m promenade.

Mechanics

Beach evolution and sedimentation accretion 

A groyne gradually creates and maintains a wide area of beach on its updrift side by trapping the sediments suspended in the ocean current.  This process is called accretion of sand and gravel or beach evolution. It reduces erosion on the other, i.e. downdrift, side by reducing the speed and power of the waves striking the shore. It is a physical barrier to stop sediment transport in the direction of longshore drift (also called longshore transport). If a groyne is correctly designed, then the amount of material it can hold will be limited, and excess sediment will be free to move on through the system. However, if a groyne is too large it may trap too much sediment, which can cause severe beach erosion on the down-drift side.

Groyne fields 

Groynes are generally placed in series, generally all perpendicular to the shore. The areas between groups of groynes are groyne fields.

Terminal groyne syndrome 

A poorly designed groyne (too long and not suited to the unique features of the coast) can also accelerate the erosion of the downdrift beach, which receives little or no sand from longshore drift. This process is known as terminal groyne syndrome, because in a series of groynes it occurs after the terminal groyne (last groyne on the downdrift side of the beach or coastline).

Headland groyne / Headland breakwater 

A breakwater is an artificial offshore structure built parallel to the shore -- similar to naturally formed barrier islands -- that normally remains unattached to the shore. When a groyne is built to attach the breakwater to the shore, it is called a "headland groyne", also known as "bulkhead groyne", "headland breakwater", "T-head groyne", or "T-shaped groyne".

Usage

Coastal management 

A groyne's length and elevation, and the spacing between groynes is determined according to local wave energy and beach slope. Groynes that are too long or too high tend to accelerate downdrift erosion, and are ineffective because they trap too much sediment. Groynes that are too short, too low, or too permeable are ineffective because they trap too little sediment. If a groyne does not extend far enough landward, water (for example at a high tide combined with a storm surge) may flow past the landward end and erode a channel bypassing the groyne, a process known as  flanking.

River management

River groynes (spur dykes, wing dykes, or wing dams) are often constructed nearly perpendicular to the riverbanks, beginning at a riverbank with a root and ending at the regulation line with a head. They maintain a channel to prevent ice jamming, and more generally improve navigation and control over lateral erosion, that would form from meanders. Groynes have a major impact on the river morphology: they cause autonomous degradation of the river.

They are also used around bridges to prevent bridge scour.

Groynes can be distinguished by how they are constructed, whether they are submerged, their effect on stream flow or by shape.

By their planview shape

Groynes can be built with different planview shapes. Some examples include straight groynes, hockey stick or curved, inverted hockey stick groynes, tail or checkmark shaped groynes, L head, straight groynes with pier head (seaward end raised on the stilts, since the pier head is raised on the stilts it does not act as the breakwater),  T-head (headland groyne, breakwater attached to the shore with straight groyne, the head/breakwater itself could be shaped straight, Y-shaped, arrow or wing shaped head).

By cross-section based on material used 

Wooden groynes, sheetpile groynes, sandbag groynes, rubble mound or gabion groynes, etc.

By permeability

Groynes can be permeable, allowing the water to flow through at reduced velocities, or impermeable, blocking and deflecting the current.
 Permeable groynes are large rocks, bamboo or timber
 impermeable groynes (solid groynes or rock armour groynes) are constructed using rock, gravel, gabions.

By whether they are submerged

Groynes can be submerged or not under normal conditions. Usually impermeable groynes are non-submerged, since flow over the top of solid groynes may cause severe erosion along the shanks. Submerged groynes, on the other hand, may be permeable depending on the degree of flow disturbance needed.

By their effect on stream flow
Groynes can be attracting, deflecting or repelling.

 Attracting groynes point downstream, serving to attract the stream flow toward themselves and not repel the flow toward the opposite bank. They tend to maintain deep current close to the bank.
 Deflecting groynes change the direction of flow without repelling it. They are generally short and used for limited, local protection.
 Repelling groynes point upstream; they force the flow away from themselves. A single groyne may have one section, for example, attracting, and another section deflecting.

Gallery

See also 

 Similar
 Training (civil)
 Breakwater
 Drop structure
 Jetty
 Beach erosion and accretion
 Beach nourishment
 Modern recession of beaches
 Raised beach
 Strand plain
 Integrated coastal zone management
 Coastal management, to prevent coastal erosion and creation of beach
 Coastal and oceanic landforms
 Coastal development hazards
 Coastal erosion
 Coastal geography
 Coastal engineering
 Coastal morphodynamics
 Coastal and Estuarine Research Federation (CERF)
 Erosion
 Bioerosion
 Blowhole
 Natural arch
 Wave-cut platform
 Longshore drift
 Deposition (sediment)
 Coastal sediment supply
 Sand dune stabilization
 Submersion

References

Notes 
 Construction Industry Research and Information Association (1990) Groynes in coastal engineering : data on performance of existing groyne systems, CIRIA technical note 135, London : CIRIA, 
  Crossman, M. and Simm, J. (2004) Manual on the use of timber in coastal and river engineering, HR Wallingford,  London : Thomas Telford, 
 French, P.W. (2001) Coastal defences : processes, problems and solutions, London : Routledge, 
 Hoyle, J.W. and King, J.T. (1971) The principles of coast protection, Lyndhurst : the authors, 
 Przedwojski, B., Błażejewski, R and Pilarczyk, K.W. (1995) River training techniques : fundamentals, design and applications, Rotterdam : Balkema, 
 Walker, D.J. (1987) Nearshore hydrodynamics and the behaviour of groynes on sandy beaches, PhD thesis, Imperial College London, 277 p.
  Also published in the Delft Hydraulics Select Series (No. 7/2005).

External links

Groynes in the Netherlands
Channel Coastal Observatory - Groynes

Coastal Wiki portal

Hydraulic engineering
Coastal construction
Coastal erosion